Tainted Love: Mating Calls and Fight Songs is the final album by Shivaree, consisting of covers. It was released by Zoë Records in 2007.

Track listing
 "Paradise" (originally by The Ronettes)
 "I Wanna Be Your Driver" (originally by Chuck Berry)
 "Half on a Baby" (originally by R. Kelly)
 "Don't Stop 'Til You Get Enough" (originally by Michael Jackson)
 "Would You Lay with Me (In a Field of Stone)" (originally by David Allan Coe)
 "Hello, Hello, I'm Back Again" (originally by Gary Glitter)
 "My Heart Belongs to You" (originally by Ike Turner)
 "Cold Blooded" (originally by Rick James)
 "Looks That Kill" (originally by Mötley Crüe)
 "Shame on You" (originally by Spade Cooley)
 "Goodnight, Irene" (popularized by Lead Belly)

Personnel
Ambrosia Parsley – Vocals
Duke McVinnie – Guitar 
Danny McGough – Keyboards

Shivaree (band) albums
2007 albums
Covers albums